Euzophera villora is a species of snout moth in the genus Euzophera. It was described by Cajetan Felder, Rudolf Felder and Alois Friedrich Rogenhofer in 1875 and is known from South Africa, Madagascar and Ethiopia.

References

Phycitini
Moths of Madagascar
Moths of Africa
Moths described in 1875
Taxa named by Alois Friedrich Rogenhofer